Un extraño en la escalera ("A Stranger on the Stairs") is a 1955 Mexican drama film directed by Tulio Demicheli. It was entered into the 1955 Cannes Film Festival.

Cast
 Arturo de Córdova
 Silvia Pinal
 José María Linares-Rivas
 Andrés Soler
 Bertica Serrano
 Sonja Marrero
 Luciano de Pazos
 César Pomar

References

External links

1955 films
1950s Spanish-language films
1955 drama films
Mexican black-and-white films
Films directed by Tulio Demicheli
Films with screenplays by Tulio Demicheli
Mexican drama films
1950s Mexican films